Kuliki may refer to:
Kuliki, Kwidzyn County, a village in north Poland
Kuliki, Sztum County, a village in north Poland
Kuliki, Oryol Oblast, a village in Oryol Oblast, Russia
Kuliki, Pskov Oblast, a village in Pskov Oblast, Russia
Kuliki, name of several other rural localities in Russia